Part, parts or PART may refer to:

People
Armi Pärt (born 1991), Estonian handballer
Arvo Pärt (born 1935), Estonian classical composer
Brian Part (born 1962), American child actor
Dealtry Charles Part (1882–1961), sheriff (1926–1927) and Lord Lieutenant (1943–1957) of Bedfordshire, racehorse owner
Dionysius Part (also known as Denys Part; died 1475), Roman Catholic prelate, Auxiliary Bishop of Mainz (1474–1475)
John Part (born 1966), Canadian darts player
Michael Pärt (born 1977), Estonian music producer and film composer
Veronika Part (born 1978), Russian ballet dancer
Pärt Uusberg (born 1986), Estonian composer and conductor
Parts (surname)

Arts, entertainment, and media
Part (music), a single strand or melody or harmony of music within a larger ensemble or a polyphonic musical composition
Parts (book), a 1997 children's book by Tedd Arnold

Transportation
Pottstown Area Rapid Transit (PART), Pennsylvania, U.S.
Putnam Area Rapid Transit (PART), New York, U.S.
Piedmont Authority for Regional Transportation (PART), North Carolina, U.S.

Other uses
Part (bibliography), volume designators in books and journals
Part (haircut), a hairstyle
Part (mathematics), a relation in mereology
Part-of, a relationship in linguistics
Parts of Lincolnshire, geographic divisions of the English county
Spare part, for replacement of a failed part
Primary age-related tauopathy, a neuropathological designation

See also

Body part (disambiguation)
Particle (disambiguation)
Parting (disambiguation)
Partition (disambiguation)
System